Ntebogang Secondary School is a public school situated approximately  west of Zeerust town in a rural village called  Dinokana. Dinokana village is found in the North West Province, in a district municipality called Ngaka Modiri Molema District Municipality) and in a local municipality called Ramotshere Moiloa Local Municipality, South Africa. The school started as a Middle School. It then became a Secondary School when Middle Schools were planned to be abolished. Founded in 1985, the school was named after Kgosi Ntebogang Moiloa of the Bahurutshe ba ga Moiloa tribe. The first principal of Ntebogang Secondary School was Mr Mteto MC, succeeded by Mr Pule EN and the current principal is Dipale OG.
The school runs from grade 8 to grade 12. The school has not enjoyed good results in the past. The current principal, together with his management team and SGB, are working very hard to make Ntebogang Secondary School the best school in Ramotshere Moiloa Sub-District.

Vision & Mission Statements 
Vision

Our school’s vision is to create one of the best performing secondary schools in Ramotshere Moiloa Local Municipality where our learners will be provided with relevant and high-quality education that challenges them to perform at their highest potential within a safe, clean and supportive environment.

Mission

Our school's mission is to create a respectful environment where both teachers and learners respect each other's time, perform their duties as expected and where each teacher strives to reach the set school targets.

Values

Location

SMT

Subjects offered 
GET: Grade 8 & 9
 Creative Arts
 Economic Management Sciences
 English FAL
 Life Orientation
 Mathematics
 Natural science
 Setswana HL
 Social Sciences
 Technology

FET: Grade 10–12
 Afrikaans 2nd Add Lang
 Business studies
 English 1st Add Lang
 Geography
 Life Orientation
 Life Sciences
 Mathematical Literacy
 Mathematics
 Physical Sciences
 Setswana Home Language

SMT responsibilities 
Deputy Principal - Mr Taowa ME
 Grade Head: Grade 12
 FET Subject Head: Afrikaans SAL, English FAL, Setswana HL
 GET Subject Head: English FAL, Setswana HL

Departmental Head 1 - Ms Maota TG
 Grade Head: Grade 11
 FET Subject Head: Business Studies, Geography, Life Sciences
 GET Subject Head: Creative Arts, Economic Management Sciences, Social Sciences

Departmental Head 2 - Mr Mafora TH
 Grade Head: Grade 8 & 9
 FET Subject Head: Mathematical Literacy, Mathematics, Physical Sciences
 GET Subject Head: Mathematics, Natural Sciences, Technology

Principals

Governing body

Teaching staff

Support staff

Learners

Grade 12 performance

Uniform

Extra-curricular activities

Facilities 
Ntebogang Secondary School boasts the following facilities:
 1 x Soccer field;
 1 x Volleyball field;
 1 x Tennis & Netball Court;
 1 x Science Laboratory;
 2 x Computer laboratories;
 1 x Tuckshop;
 1 x NSNP Kitchen
 1 x Guard Room;
 1 x Mini Hall;
 2 x Admin Blocks;
 27 x Classrooms;
 2 x Boys & Girls Toilets;
 1 x Sport Equipment Room
 3 x Houses of Lords

References

 
 https://www.education.gov.za/Resources/Reports.aspx
 https://provincialgovernment.co.za/units/view/100/north-west/education

High schools in South Africa
Schools in North West (South African province)
Ngaka Modiri Molema District Municipality